The Transfiguration Cathedral is the name given to a Russian Orthodox church in the Diocese of Tiraspol and Dubossary, Bender, a town controlled by Transnistria, de facto independent territory of Moldova.

Its history dates back to 1814 when working on the expansion of local strength. It was built between 1815 and 1820 to constitute a symbol of liberation from Ottoman Turkish rule place.

It was consecrated on December 5, 1819. From 1918 to 1944 (except for the Soviet period, from 1940 to 1941) the parish church belonged to the Romanian Orthodox Church.

Since 1948 the cathedral was placed under state protection as a monument of architecture of the early nineteenth century.

See also
Church of the Nativity, Tiraspol
Transfiguration Cathedral (disambiguation)

References

Cathedrals in Transnistria
Churches completed in 1820
Bender, Moldova